Bondra is a surname. Notable people with the surname include:

Anna Bondra (1798–1836), Austrian operatic soprano and mezzo-soprano
Dávid Bondra (born 1992), American-born Slovak ice hockey player, son of Peter
Peter Bondra (born 1968), Soviet-born Slovak ice hockey player

Slovak-language surnames